Charles James Elleby (born June 16, 2000) is an American professional basketball player for the Salt Lake City Stars of the NBA G League. He played college basketball for the Washington State Cougars.

Early life and high school career
Elleby was born in Federal Way, Washington, grew up in Seattle, Washington, and attended Cleveland High School. As a sophomore, Elleby averaged 16 points and 10 rebounds and helped lead Cleveland to the state playoffs. He averaged 23.0 points, 13.0 rebounds and 4.0 assists per game and was named second-team All-Metro League in his junior season. Elleby averaged 23.5 points per game as a senior and was named first-team All-Metro and first-team All-State by the Associated Press and The News Tribune. Elleby committed to play college basketball at Washington State early in his senior year over offers from Washington and Seattle.

College career
Elleby averaged 14.7 points and 7.1 rebounds per game as a true freshman and was named to the Pac-12 Conference's All-Freshman team. He scored a season high 26 points against rival Washington. In wake of the firing of WSU head coach Ernie Kent, Elleby initially declared for the 2019 NBA draft but did not hire an agent and ultimately decided to return to Washington State for his sophomore season.

Elleby entered his sophomore season as a preseason first team All-Pac-12 selection and was named to the Julius Erving and Wooden Award watchlists. Elleby was named the Pac-12 Player of the Week on January 20, 2020 after scoring 25 points with a career-high 14 rebounds in 72–61 victory against eighth-ranked Oregon and scoring 22 points with nine rebounds and five assists in a 89–76 win over Oregon State. Elleby scored a career-high 27 points with 12 rebounds and hit a go-ahead three-pointer with four seconds left to beat Arizona State 67–65. Elleby set a new career high with 34 points while also grabbing 10 rebounds on February 9, 2020 in a 79–67 win over Washington. Elleby became the third-fastest player in Cougars' history to score 1,000 career points during a 21-point performance in a 78–74 win over Washington to complete a regular season sweep of the Huskies. At the conclusion of the regular season, Elleby was named to the First Team All-Pac-12. As a sophomore, Elleby averaged 18.4 points and 7.8 rebounds per game. Following the season, he declared for the 2020 NBA draft. On July 31, Elleby announced he was remaining in the draft, forgoing two seasons of college eligibility.

Professional career

Portland Trail Blazers (2020–2022)
Elleby was selected with the 46th pick in the 2020 NBA draft by the Portland Trail Blazers. On November 22, he signed a two-year contract and announced that he would wear the number 16 with Portland.

Iowa Wolves (2022–2023)
On August 23, 2022, Elleby signed with the Minnesota Timberwolves. He was then later waived on October 15, 2022. On November 2, 2022, Elleby was named to the opening night roster for the Iowa Wolves. He was waived on February 2, 2023.

Salt Lake City Stars (2023–present)
On February 20, 2023, Elleby was acquired by the Salt Lake City Stars.

Career statistics

NBA

Regular season

|-
| style="text-align:left;"|
| style="text-align:left;"|Portland
| 30 || 0 || 6.8 || .279 || .206 || .733 || 1.1 || .3 || .2 || .1 || 2.3
|-
| style="text-align:left;"|
| style="text-align:left;"|Portland
| 58 || 28 || 20.2 || .393 || .294 || .714 || 3.9 || 1.5 || .6 || .3 || 5.8
|- class="sortbottom"
| style="text-align:center;" colspan="2"| Career
| 88 || 28 || 15.5 || .390 || .275 || .717 || 2.9 || 1.1 || .5 || .3 || 4.6

Playoffs

|-
| style="text-align:left;"| 2021
| style="text-align:left;"| Portland
| 2 || 0 || 4.0 || .000 || — || — || 1.5 || .5 || .0 || .0 || .0
|- class="sortbottom"
| style="text-align:center;" colspan="2"| Career
| 2 || 0 || 4.0 || .000 || — || — || 1.5 || .5 || .0 || .0 || .0

College

|-
| style="text-align:left;"| 2018–19
| style="text-align:left;"| Washington State
| 32 || 28 || 31.0 || .436 || .414 || .661 || 7.1 || 3.0 || 1.0 || .6 || 14.7
|-
| style="text-align:left;"| 2019–20
| style="text-align:left;"| Washington State
| 32 || 32 || 33.4 || .396 || .339 || .823 || 7.8 || 1.9 || 1.8 || .8 || 18.4
|- class="sortbottom"
| style="text-align:center;" colspan="2"| Career
| 64 || 60 || 32.2 || .413 || .367 || .749 || 7.5 || 2.4 || 1.4 || .7 || 16.6

Personal life
Elleby's father, Bill Elleby, played basketball collegiately at California and runs Seattle Basketball Services, a collegiate scouting service. Elleby has four siblings.

References

External links
Washington State Cougars bio

2000 births
Living people
American men's basketball players
Basketball players from Seattle
Iowa Wolves players
Portland Trail Blazers draft picks
Portland Trail Blazers players
Small forwards
Washington State Cougars men's basketball players